Cascabela thevetia (syn: Thevetia peruviana) is a poisonous plant native throughout Mexico and in Central America, and cultivated widely as an ornamental. It is a relative of Nerium oleander, giving it a common name yellow oleander.

Etymology
'Cascabel', 'cascavel' or 'cascabela' is Spanish for a small bell, a snake's rattle or a rattlesnake itself. The allusion may also be to the plant's toxicity comparable to the venom of a rattlesnake. The latin specific name thevetia commemorates André de Thevet (1516-1590), a French Franciscan priest and explorer, who explored Brazil and Guiana (where the plant is known as chapéu-de-napoleão, ie, Napoleon's hat).

Description
Cascabela thevetia is an evergreen tropical shrub or small tree. Its leaves are willow-like, linear-lanceolate, and glossy green in color. They are covered in waxy coating to reduce water loss (typical of oleanders). Its stem is green turning silver/gray as it ages. Flowers bloom from summer to fall. The long funnel-shaped sometimes-fragrant yellow (less commonly apricot, sometimes white) flowers are in few-flowered terminal clusters. Its fruit is deep red-black in color encasing a large seed that bears some resemblance to a 'Chinese lucky nut.'

Cascabela thevetia is commonly known as Kaneir or Kaner (कनेर) in Hindi language in India. It is effectively drought resistant and tolerant to high temperatures, hence found in various states of India like Andhra, Bihar, Delhi, Gujarat, Madhya Pradesh, Telangana, West Bengal, Rajasthan, Tamil Nadu, Uttar Pradesh , Odisha and Assam where semi arid climate is prevalent.

Religious importance
Its bright yellow flowers are used for religious purposes in India. The tree is native to Mexico and thus direct references to Hindu culture are new.

Toxicity

All parts of the C. thevetia plant are toxic to most vertebrates as they contain cardiac glycosides. Many cases of intentional and accidental poisoning of humans are known.

The main toxins are the cardenolides called thevetin A and thevetin B; others include peruvoside, neriifolin, thevetoxin and ruvoside. These cardenolides are not destroyed by drying or heating and they are very similar to digoxin from Digitalis purpurea. They produce gastric and cardiotoxic effects. Antidotes for treatment include atropine and digoxin immune fabs (antibodies) and treatment may include oral administration of activated charcoal. Ovine polyclonal anti-digitoxin Fab fragment antibody (DigiTAb; Therapeutic Antibodies Inc.) can be used to treat T. peruviana poisoning, but for many countries the cost is prohibitive.

A few bird species are however known to feed on them without any ill effects. These include the sunbirds, Asian koel, red-whiskered bulbul, white-browed bulbul, red-vented bulbul, brahminy myna, common myna and common grey hornbill.

In South India and in Sri Lanka swallowing the seeds of Thevetia peruviana (Kaneru කණේරු (Sinhala), Manjal arali (Tamil)) is one of the preferred methods for suicides in villages where they are grown in abundance.

Extracts from C. thevetia are reported to possess antispermatogenic activity in rats.

Uses

Cultivation
Cascabela thevetia is cultivated as an ornamental plant, and planted as large flowering shrub or small ornamental tree standards in gardens and parks in temperate climates. In frost prone areas it is container plant, in the winter season brought inside a greenhouse or as a house plant. It tolerates most soils and is drought tolerant.

Biological pest control
The plant's toxins have tested in experiments for uses in biological pest control.  T. peruviana seed oil was used to make a 'paint' with antifungal, antibacterial and anti-termite properties.

Gallery

References

External links

USDA Plants - Thevetia peruviana
Inchem.org: Thevetia peruviana
Kemper Center for Home Gardening.org - Thevetia peruviana horticultural info and photos

Thevetia
Flora of Mexico
Flora of South America
Plant toxin insecticides
Garden plants of North America
Garden plants of Central America
Drought-tolerant plants
Poisonous plants